George Kempt (July 8, 1821 – March 9, 1885) was an Ontario businessman and political figure. He represented Victoria South in the 1st Canadian Parliament as a Liberal Party of Canada member.

He was born in Cromarty, Scotland, in 1821, the son of Kenneth Kempt, and came to Peterborough County in Upper Canada with his family in 1831. Kempt was a lumber and grain merchant. He served on the township council for Lindsay, also serving as reeve. In 1872, he was named sheriff for Victoria County.

In 1849, he married Anne Jane Macaulay. He died in Lindsay at the age of 63.

References 

1821 births
1885 deaths
Liberal Party of Canada MPs
Members of the House of Commons of Canada from Ontario
People from the Black Isle
People from Peterborough County
Scottish emigrants to pre-Confederation Ontario
Immigrants to Upper Canada